Henri Marret (1878–1964) was a French painter.

1878 births
1964 deaths
Chevaliers of the Légion d'honneur
20th-century French painters
20th-century French male artists
French male painters